Lensgreve Johann Friedrich Struensee (5 August 1737 – 28 April 1772) was a German-Danish physician, philosopher and statesman. He became royal physician to the mentally ill King Christian VII of Denmark and a minister in the Danish government. He rose in power to a position of "de facto" regent of the country, where he tried to carry out widespread reforms. His affair with Queen Caroline Matilda ("Caroline Mathilde") caused a scandal, especially after the birth of a daughter, Princess Louise Augusta, and was the catalyst for the intrigues and power play that caused his downfall and dramatic death.

Upbringing and early career 
Born at Halle an der Saale and baptized at St. Moritz on 7 August 1737, Struensee was the third child of six born to Pietist theologian and minister Adam Struensee (baptized in Neuruppin on 8 September 1708 – Rendsburg, 20 June 1791), Pfarrer ("curate") in Halle an der Saale in 1732, "Dr. theol. (h. c.) von Halle" ("Doctor of Theology (honoris causa, "for the honor") from the University of Halle) in 1757, pastor in Altona between 1757 and 1760, "Kgl. Generalsuperintendant von Schleswig und Holstein" ("Royal general superintendent of Schleswig and Holstein") between 1760 and 1791, and his wife (m. Berleburg, 8 May 1732) Maria Dorothea Carl (Berleburg, 31 July 1716 – Schleswig, 31 December 1792), a respectable middle-class family that believed in religious tolerance. Three of the Struensee sons went to University, but none became theologians like their father; two of the daughters married ministers.

Johann Friedrich entered the University of Halle on 5 August 1752 at the age of fifteen where he studied medicine, and graduated as a Doctor in Medicine ("Dr. Med.") on 12 December 1757. The university exposed him to Age of Enlightenment ideals, and social and political critique and reform. He supported these new ideas, becoming a proponent of atheism, the writings of Claude Adrien Helvétius, and other French materialists.

When Adam and Maria Dorothea Struensee moved to Altona in 1758, where the elder Struensee became pastor of Trinitatiskirche (Trinity's Church), Johann Friedrich moved with them. He was soon employed as a public doctor in Altona, in the estate of Count Rantzau, and in the Pinneberg District. His wages were meager and he expected to supplement them with private practice.

His parents moved to Rendsburg in 1760 where Adam Struensee became first superintendent (comparable to bishop) for the duchy, and subsequently superintendent-general of Schleswig-Holstein. Struensee, now 23 years old, had to set up his own household for the first time. His lifestyle expectations were not matched by his economics. His superior intelligence and elegant manners, however, soon made him fashionable in the better circles, and he entertained his contemporaries with his controversial opinions.

Struensee was ambitious and petitioned the Danish government through Minister of Foreign Affairs Count Johann Hartwig Ernst von Bernstorff for funds. He tried his hand at writing Enlightenment treatises and published many of them in his journal Zum Nutzen und Vergnügen ("For benefit and enjoyment").

Physician to King Christian VII 
During Struensee's near ten-year residence in Altona he came into contact with a circle of aristocrats who had been sent away from the royal court in Copenhagen. Among them were Enevold Brandt and Count Schack Carl Rantzau, who were supporters of the Enlightenment. Rantzau recommended Struensee to the court as a physician to attend King Christian VII on his forthcoming tour to princely and royal courts in western Germany, the Netherlands, England, and France.

Struensee received the appointment in April 1768. The king and his entourage set forth on 6 May. While in England Struensee received the honorary degree of Doctor in Medicine from the University of Cambridge.

During the eight-month tour he gained the king's confidence and affection. The king's ministers, Bernstorff and Finance Minister H.C. Schimmelmann, were pleased with Struensee's influence on the king, who began making fewer embarrassing "scenes". Upon the court's return to Copenhagen in January 1769, Struensee was appointed personal physician to the king. In May, he was given the honorary title of State Councillor, which advanced him to the class of the third rank at court. Struensee wrote an important report on the mental health of the King.

Rise to power 

First he reconciled the king and queen. At first Caroline Matilda disliked Struensee, but she was unhappy in her marriage, neglected and spurned by the king, and affected by his illness. But Struensee was one of the few people who paid attention to the lonely queen, and he seemed to do his best to alleviate her troubles. Over time her affection for the young doctor grew and by spring 1770 he became her lover; a successful vaccination of the baby crown prince in May still further increased his influence.

Struensee was very involved with the upbringing of the Crown Prince Frederick VI along the principles of Enlightenment, such as outlined by Jean-Jacques Rousseau's challenge to return to nature. However, he had his own rather strict interpretation of Rousseau's ideas by isolating the child and encouraging him to manage things largely on his own. He also took Rousseau's advice about cold being beneficial for children literally, and the Crown Prince was thus only sparsely clothed even during winter time.

In control of the government 

Struensee was named royal adviser (forelæser) and konferensråd on 5 May 1770. As in the course of the year the king sank into a condition of mental torpor, Struensee's authority became paramount. On the 15th September the 16-month period generally referred to as the "Time of Struensee" began.

At first, Struensee kept a low profile as he began to control the political machine. However, as the royal court and government spent the summer of 1770 in Schleswig-Holstein (Gottorp, Traventhal, and Ascheberg) his power grew. In December 1770, he grew impatient and on the 10th of that month he abolished the council of state. A week later he appointed himself maître des requêtes. It became his official duty to present reports from the various departments of state to the king. Because King Christian was scarcely responsible for his actions, Struensee dictated whatever answers he pleased. Next, he dismissed all department heads, and abolished the Norwegian viceroyship. Henceforth, the cabinet with himself as its motive power, became the one supreme authority in the state. Struensee held absolute sway for almost thirteen months, between 18 December 1770 and 16 January 1772. During this time he issued no fewer than 1,069 cabinet orders, or more than three a day.

Reforms initiated by Struensee included:
abolition of torture
abolition of unfree labor (corvée)
abolition of the censorship of the press
abolition of the practice of preferring nobles for state offices
abolition of noble privileges
abolition of "undeserved" revenues for nobles
abolition of the etiquette rules at the Royal Court
abolition of the Royal Court's aristocracy
abolition of state funding of unproductive manufacturers
abolition of several holidays
introduction of a tax on gambling and luxury horses to fund nursing of foundlings
ban of slave trade in the Danish colonies
rewarding only actual achievements with feudal titles and decorations
criminalization and punishment of bribery
re-organization of the judicial institutions to minimize corruption
introduction of state-owned grain storages to balance out the grain price
assignment of farmland to peasants
re-organization and reduction of the army
university reforms
reform of the state-owned medical institutions

Other reforms included the abolition of capital punishment for theft, the doing away with such demoralizing abuses as perquisites, and of "lackey-ism", the appointment of powerful men's domestic staff to lucrative public posts.

Critics of Struensee thought that he did not respect native Danish and Norwegian customs, seeing them as prejudices and wanting to eliminate them in favor of abstract principles. He also did not speak Danish, conducting his business in German. To ensure obedience, he dismissed entire staffs of public departments, without pensions or compensation, and substituted with nominees of his own. These new officials were in many cases inexperienced men who knew little or nothing of the country they were supposed to govern.

While initially the Danish people favored his reforms, they began to turn against him. When Struensee abolished all censorship of the press, it mostly resulted in a flood of anti-Struensee pamphlets.

During the initial months of his rule, middle class opinion was in his favor. What incensed the people most against him was the way in which he put the king completely on one side; and this feeling was all the stronger as, outside a very narrow court circle, nobody seems to have believed that Christian VII was really mad, but only that his will had been weakened by habitual ill usage; and this opinion was confirmed by the publication of the cabinet order of 14 July 1771, appointing Struensee "gehejme kabinetsminister" or "Geheimekabinetsminister", with authority to issue cabinet orders which were to have the force of royal ordinances, even if unprovided with the royal sign-manual.

Struensee's relations with the queen were offensive to a nation which had a traditional veneration for the royal House of Oldenburg, while Caroline Matilda's conduct in public scandalized the populace. The society which daily gathered round the king and queen excited the derision of the foreign ambassadors. The unhappy king was little more than the butt of his environment, but occasionally the king would put up a show of obstinacy and refuse to carry out Brandt's or Struensee's orders. Once, when he threatened his keeper, Brandt, with a flogging for some impertinence, Brandt ended up in a struggle with the King, and in the course of this he struck the King in the face.

Arrest and execution 

Struensee's dismissal of many government officials and officers brought him many political enemies. On 30 November 1771, he declared himself and Brandt counts. These actions stirred feelings of unease and dissatisfaction in the populace of Denmark and Norway.

Christian VII along with his queen, Struensee, Brandt, and members of the royal court, spent the summer of 1771 at Hirschholm Palace north of Copenhagen. They stayed there until late in the autumn. On 7 July, the queen gave birth to a daughter, Louise Augusta. The court moved to Frederiksberg Palace just west of Copenhagen on 19 November.

The general ill will against Struensee, which had been smouldering all through the autumn of 1771, found expression in a conspiracy against him, headed by Schack Carl Rantzau and others, in the name of the Queen Dowager Juliana Maria, to wrest power away from the king, and secure her and her son's positions of power.

The court returned to Christiansborg Palace on 8 January 1772. The season's first masquerade ball was held at the Court Theatre on 16 January.

A palace coup took place in the early morning of 17 January 1772, Struensee, Brandt and Queen Caroline Matilda were arrested in their respective bedrooms, and the perceived liberation of the king, who was driven round Copenhagen by his deliverers in a gold carriage, was received with universal rejoicing. The chief charge against Struensee was that he had usurped the royal authority in contravention of the Royal Law (Kongelov). He defended himself with considerable ability and, at first, confident that the prosecution would not dare to lay hands on the queen, he denied that their liaison had ever been criminal. The queen was taken as prisoner of state to Kronborg Castle.

On 27 April/28 April, Struensee and Brandt were condemned first to lose their right hands and then to be beheaded; their bodies were afterwards to be drawn and quartered. The Kongelov had no provisions for a mentally ill ruler who was unfit to govern. However, as a commoner who had imposed himself in the circles of nobility, Struensee was condemned as being guilty of lèse majesté and usurpation of the royal authority, both capital offences according to paragraphs 2 and 26 of the Kongelov.

Struensee awaited his execution at Kastellet, Copenhagen. The sentences were carried out on 28 April 1772 with Brandt being executed first.

The king himself considered Struensee a great man, even after his death. Written in German on a drawing the king made in 1775, three years after Struensee's execution, was the following: "Ich hätte gern beide gerettet" ("I would have liked to have saved them both"), referring to Struensee and Brandt.

Cultural depictions

Struensee, his affair with the queen and his relation with the king, has featured in many artistic works:

Literature 
 1773 : A faithful narrative of the conversion and death of Count Struensee, late Prime Minister of Denmark (1773) by Balthasar Münter (translated Jørgen Hee)
 1935 : Die Gefangene von Celle – a 1935 novel by Else von Hollander-Lossow
 1935 : The Favourite of the Queen (later Der  der Königin) – a 1935 novel by Robert Neumann
 1948 : The Queen's Physician – a 1948 novel by Edgar Maass
 1953 : Converse at Night in Copenhagen – a 1953 novel by Karen Blixen
 1955 : Caroline Matilda, princess of Great Britain and queen of Denmark – a 1955 novel by Geoffrey Vaughan Blackstone
 1969 : The Lost Queen – a 1969 historical novel by Norah Lofts
 1985 : Letter from Celle – a 1985 dramatic poem by Edward Lowbury
 1999 : The Visit of the Royal Physician – a 1999 novel by Per Olov Enquist
 2000 : Prinsesse af Blodet - en roman om Caroline Mathilde – a 2000 novel by Bodil Steensen-Leth
 2015 : There's a mad king in Denmark – a 2015 biographical novel by Dario Fo

Stage 
 1827 : Struensee – an 1827 drama by Michael Beer with stage music by his brother Giacomo Meyerbeer (Stuttgart and Tübingen: Cotta 1829, premiered in Munich in 1828). The play was originally forbidden under the rule of the Prussian King Frederick William III, and finally allowed by his more liberal successor Frederick William IV and premiered in Berlin in 1856.
 1991 : Caroline Mathilde – a 1991 two-act ballet staged by the Royal Danish Ballet and choreographed by Flemming Flindt to music by Sir Peter Maxwell Davies.
 2008 : The Visit of the Royal Physician – a 2008 opera staged by the Royal Danish Opera and composed by Bo Holten to a libretto based on Enquist's 1999 novel.

In film
 1923 : The Love of a Queen – a 1923 German historical drama silent film directed by Ludwig Wolff, in which Struensee is played by Harry Liedtke.
 1935 : The Dictator – a 1935 British film directed by Victor Saville, in which Struensee was played by the English actor Clive Brook. The film depicts his relationship with Caroline Mathilde, who is played by Madeleine Carroll.
 1957 : King in Shadow – a 1957 West German feature film directed by Harald Braun, and based on Neumann's 1935 novel, in which Struensee was portrayed by O.W. Fischer. 
 2012 : A Royal Affair – an Academy Award-nominated Danish historical drama film directed by Nikolaj Arcel, starring Mads Mikkelsen as Struensee.

References

Further reading 

 Barton, H. Arnold.  Scandinavia in the Revolutionary Era 1760–1815, University of Minnesota Press, 1986. .
 Commager, Henry Steele.  "Struensee and the Enlightenment," The search for a usable past, and other essays in historiography (1967) pp 349+.
 Dewey, Donald. "The Danish Rasputin" Scandinavian Review (2013) 100#1 online
Tilliyard, Stella. A Royal Affair: George III and his Scandalous Siblings. Chatto & Windus, 2006.

In Danish, Swedish or German
 
 
 
 .
 
 Bech, Svend Cedergreen. Struensee og hans tid. 2nd ed. Viborg. Forlaget Cicero, 1989. 
 Lars Bisgaard, Claus Bjørn, Michael Bregnsbo, Merete Harding, Kurt Villads Jensen, Knud J. V. Jespersen, Danmarks Konger og Dronninger (Copenhagen, 2004)
 Bregnsbo, Michael. Caroline Mathilde – Magt og Skæbne. Denmark. Aschehoug Dansk Forlag, 2007. 
 Gether, Christian (editor), Kronprins og Menneskebarn (Sorø, 1988)
 Glebe-Møller. Struensees vej til skafottet – Fornuft og åbenbaring i oplysningstiden. Copenhagen. Museum Tusculanums Forlag, 2007. 
 Thiedecke, Johnny. For Folket. Oplysning, Magt og vanvid i Struensee-tidens Danmark. Viborg. Forlaget Pantheon, 2004. 
 Winkle, Stefan: Johann Friedrich Struensee. Arzt – Aufklärer – Staatsmann, Stuttgart: Fischer 1989 (2nd ed.). Online excerpt (Ärztekammer Hamburg).

Primary sources

External links 

 Johann Friedrich Struensee at the website of the Royal Danish Collection at Rosenborg Castle
 The Ancestry of Johann Friedrich Struensee (1737–1772)
 
 

1737 births
1772 deaths
Court of Christian VII of Denmark
People from Halle (Saale)
Danish people of German descent
18th-century Danish politicians
18th-century Danish physicians
18th-century German physicians
Danish atheists
German atheism activists
People from the Duchy of Magdeburg
University of Halle alumni
German people executed abroad
Executed Danish people
People executed by Denmark by decapitation
18th-century executions by Denmark
Executed people from Saxony-Anhalt
Court physicians
Caroline Matilda of Great Britain
Danish royal favourites